Austropyrgus elongatus is a species of minute freshwater snail with an operculum, an aquatic gastropod mollusc or micromollusc in the Hydrobiidae family. This species is endemic to eastern Tasmania, Australia. It is only known from one location on Apsley River.

See also 
 List of non-marine molluscs of Australia

References

Further reading

External links

Hydrobiidae
Austropyrgus
Gastropods of Australia
Endemic fauna of Australia
Gastropods described in 1921